SWAG (styledS×W×A×G) is the first album by Japanese singer-songwriter Tomomi Itano. It was released in Japan on the label King Records on July 2, 2014.

The album was released in three versions: the Limited Edition, the Regular Edition and the Samantha Vega Edition (the latter is released in collaboration with the accessory line Samantha Vega).

It included title tracks from all five of Tomomi Itano's CD singles (from the debut single "Dear J" to the fifth single "Little"), two limited-distribution digital singles ("Wanna Be Now" and "Ai ni Pierce"), and four new songs. S×W×A×G is an acronym for “Sexy, Wonder, Attitude, Give”.

Track listing

Limited and regular editions

Samantha Vega edition

Charts

References 

2014 debut albums
King Records (Japan) albums
Japanese-language albums
Tomomi Itano albums